The Domus, formerly known in spanish as "Casa del Hombre", is a science museum located in A Coruña, in Galicia, Spain. It was inaugurated on April 7, 1995.

Background and Architecture
The museum was conceived by Ramón Núñez Centella and designed by architects Arata Isozaki and César Portela.

It includes walls and staircases made of granite, and on its facade it includes 6,600 pieces of slate. The museum includes 1500 m2 of space for exhibitions, spread over almost 200 modules. Most of them are interactive.

See also 

 Aquarium Finisterrae

References

External links 

 Official website 

Museums in Galicia (Spain)
Science museums
A Coruña